The Cork county ladies' football team represents Cork GAA in ladies' Gaelic football. The team competes in inter-county competitions such as the All-Ireland Senior Ladies' Football Championship, the Munster Senior Ladies' Football Championship and the Ladies' National Football League.

After winning their first All-Ireland and League titles in 2005, Cork went on to dominate both competitions during the late 2000s and the 2010s. Between 2005 and 2009 Cork were All-Ireland champions five times in a row. They then achieved an All-Ireland six in a row between 2011 and 2016. During this era they also won eleven consecutive League titles. In 2014 the Cork senior ladies' football team also won the RTÉ Sports Team of the Year Award.

History

Early years
In 1973, during a carnival at Banteer, Cork played Kerry in an inter-county game. Kerry won by 5–10 to 4–11. The match was refereed by Dinny Long, the Cork senior men's footballer. In 1974, together with Kerry, Roscommon, Laois, Offaly, Galway, Waterford and Tipperary, Cork was one of eight GAA counties who played in the inaugural All-Ireland Senior Ladies' Football Championship. Cork and the other three Munster counties also agree to play an inaugural Munster Senior Ladies' Football Championship. After thirty years living very much in the shadow of their neighbours, Kerry and Waterford, Cork won their first Munster title until 2004 and their first senior All-Ireland title in 2005.

Senior final appearances
All-Irelands
Between 2005 and 2016, with a team that included Valerie Mulcahy, Juliet Murphy, Angela Walsh, Mary O'Connor, Rena Buckley and Briege Corkery, Cork won eleven All-Ireland titles. In 2014, after winning their ninth title, Cork won the RTÉ Sports Team of the Year Award. They were the first female team to win the award. They received 27% of the vote, beating the Ireland men's national rugby union team, winners of the 2014 Six Nations Championship, by 11%.

Ladies' National Football League

Munster Senior Ladies' Football Championship

Notable players

TG4 Senior Player's Player of the Year

All Stars

Ireland internationals
A number of Cork ladies' footballers have also represented Ireland at international level in various other sports.

Captains

Managers
 Éamonn Ryan
 Ephie Fitzgerald

Honours
 All-Ireland Senior Ladies' Football Championship 
Winners: 2005, 2006, 2007, 2008, 2009, 2011, 2012, 2013, 2014, 2015, 2016: 11
Runners up: 2018: 1
Ladies' National Football League 
Winners: 2005, 2006, 2008, 2009, 2010, 2011, 2013, 2014, 2015, 2016, 2017, 2019: 12
Runners up: 1993, 2012: 2
 Munster Senior Ladies' Football Championship 
Winners: 2004, 2005, 2006, 2008, 2009, 2010, 2011, 2012, 2014, 2015, 2016, 2018, 2019: 13
Runners up: 2013: 1
RTÉ Sports Team of the Year Award 
 2014

References

External links
 corkladiesfootball.com

1973 establishments in Ireland
 
Ladies